The Quint is an informal decision-making group consisting of the United States and the Big Four of Western Europe (France, Germany, Italy and the United Kingdom). It operates as a "directoire" of various entities such as NATO, OECD and the G7/G20.

The United States, France and the United Kingdom are "nuclear-weapon states", while Germany and Italy have nuclear weapon sharing programs.

History
The idea of a trilateral axis on foreign policy issues was proposed by French President Charles de Gaulle to his British and American counterparts (see Fouchet Plan). However, that plan was never implemented. Meetings with that goal took place around 1980 between the foreign ministers of these three countries and West Germany, although they were largely symbolic and led to no real decision. The Quint in its current form seems to have begun as the Contact Group excluding Russia. Nowadays, Quint leaders discuss all major international topics participating in video conferences or meeting one another in various forums such as NATO, the OSCE, the G20 and the UN. The Quint meets also at ministerial and experts' level.
 Quint countries along with Russia and China participate together in global discussions  as in the Syrian case, they have joint statements and meetings as in  the case of Lebanon.

Current government leaders

See also 
 Great power
 Power (international relations)
 Thermonuclear weapon

References

Foreign relations of the United States
Foreign relations of France
Foreign relations of Germany
Foreign relations of Italy
Foreign relations of the United Kingdom